Lola Omolola (born August 1, 1976) is a Nigerian former journalist who founded the Female IN (FIN) group on Facebook. Lola is the first Nigerian woman who created a place where other women can share their untold stories regarding their sexual abuses, and other challenges they are facing. She was featured in the 2018 Facebook F8 Conference.

Education 
Omolola completed her primary and secondary studies in Nigeria. After moving to the United States, she earned a Bachelor's degree in Broadcast journalism from Columbia College in Chicago.

Career 
Omolola is a former journalist, and she owned some TV shows in Nigeria. After earning her degree, she worked at the Community Counseling Centers of Chicago where she assisted people with mental health issues. Also, Omolola worked " for apartments.com but decided to quit when she had children." As a result, she started her own website called spicebaby.com where she was providing recipes for Nigerian food. Then she created FIN which is a Facebook page where women from Nigeria meet and share their stories without embarrassment. The group started as Female in Nigeria, but now changed to "Female IN" to accommodate its increasingly diverse membership. FIN has more than a million women who use this Facebook page. It is a private page that can only be accessed by its members.
Omolola's goal is to help women who are struggling with life, but can not tell anyone about their issues because of tradition. In many countries like Nigeria, girls and women are voiceless. "[W]henever a girl shows any sign of self-awareness she gets silenced." So, FIN is for those voiceless women who have nobody to listen and encourage them.

Accomplishments 
After she created FIN, Omolola met the Facebook founder Mark Zuckerberg. They discussed how women are getting support from FIN. In an interview with CNN, Mark Zuckerberg phased her for connecting voiceless women and building a safe community for them on Facebook. Lola is now planning to move forward with FIN by "providing centres where women can go to talk about their experiences in a safe space."

References

1976 births
Living people
Nigerian women journalists
Columbia College Chicago alumni